Juanita Hamel Early Fowle (April 27, 1891 – July 12, 1939) was an American artist and writer whose syndicated stories and illustrations appeared in newspapers across the United States in the 1910s and 1920s.

Early life
Juanita Hamel was born in DeSoto, Missouri, the daughter of Frederick G. Hamel and Lucile McCormack Hamel (later Lucile Hamel Craven). She studied at the St. Louis School of Fine Arts, part of Washington University in St. Louis.

Career

By 1916, Hamel was employed as an artist at the St. Louis Times. Soon after, she moved to Chicago and joined the staff at the Chicago Herald. She moved to New York City by 1920. Her illustrations, often young pretty women with voluminous hair, were syndicated nationally through the Hearst Newspaper Feature Syndicate. She also illustrated magazines and sheet music. Her style is sometimes considered as influenced by comic artist Nell Brinkley.

She was quoted in 1921, summarizing her career path to that date: 
I landed my first job on the St. Louis Times, and covered all sorts of assignments, from murder trials to interviewing Mrs. Woodrow Wilson. Then I went to the Chicago Herald where I wrote fiction in serial and short story form. Another short step and I was in New York drawing for the Newspaper Feature Service.

Fiction by Hamel included The Girls of the Second Floor Back (serialized in 1916) and The Straight Girl on the Crooked Path (serialized in 1917).

Personal life
Juanita Hamel married twice. She married John Vinton "Tim" Early, a fellow newspaper illustrator, in 1921. She was widowed when Early died in 1925. She later married Alison Fowle, an English lord, and lived in Hamilton, Bermuda, with regular visits back to the United States. She died there in 1939, aged 48 years. Illustrations by Hamel are in the Swann Collection of the Library of Congress.

References

External links
A photograph of Juanita Hamel painting at an easel outdoors in Gloucester, Massachusetts in 1929, in the Alton H. Blackington Collection of the University of Massachusetts Amherst Libraries
Trina Robbins, "Women in Comics: An Introductory Guide" National Association of Comic Art Educators.
Trina Robbins and Catherine Yronwode, Women and the Comics (Eclipse Books 1985).
Dave Strickler, Syndicated Comic Strips and Artists, 1924-1995: The Complete Index (Comics Access 1995).
Allen Holtz, American Newspaper Comics: An Encyclopedic Reference Guide (University of Michigan Press 2012).

1891 births
1939 deaths
American illustrators
People from De Soto, Missouri
Sam Fox School of Design & Visual Arts alumni
Washington University in St. Louis alumni
20th-century American women artists
20th-century women artists
20th-century American journalists
20th-century American women writers